Commelinaceomyces is a genus of fungi in the family Clavicipitaceae.

Species of this genus cause false smut of some species of Commelinaceae.The type species Commelinaceomyces aneilematis forms sori on flower part of Murdannia keisak.

Species 
The index fungorum currently (2021) lists:

 Commelinaceomyces aneilematis (S. Ito) E. Tanaka (2020)
 Commelinaceomyces burkillii (Syd., P. Syd. & E.J. Butler) E. Tanaka 2020 
 Commelinaceomyces nawaschinii (Racib.) E. Tanaka 2020
 Commelinaceomyces rwandensis (T. Majewski & K.A. Nowak) E. Tanaka 2020

References

External links
Index Fungorum

Clavicipitaceae
Taxa described in 2020
Hypocreales genera